Werneth School (formerly Bredbury Comprehensive School) is a coeducational secondary school located in Bredbury near Stockport, Greater Manchester, England.

History
The original school buildings came into use in 1941, and several additions and extensions have been added over the years. Specialist provision is available for all subjects. There are extensive playing fields, an all-weather pitch, two gymnasia, a Sports Hall, laboratory accommodation, Technology workshops, computing facilities, maths facilities and a School Library and Resource Centre.

The school won the National Literacy Trust's 2006/2007 Reading Connects School of the Year Competition, and the school received very good reports in Spring 2007 from Ofsted.The school's librarian, Nikki Heath, was awarded the School Librarian of the Year Award by the School Library Association in May 2008. On 4 December 2014, Nicky Morgan, secretary of state for education visited the school.

Previously a community school administered by Stockport Metropolitan Borough Council, in January 2021 Werneth School converted to academy status. The school is now sponsored by the Education Learning Trust.

Notable former pupils

 Will Mellor - Actor
 Andy Holt - Footballer
 James Goddard - Swimmer
 Rob Clarke - Runner

References

External links
 Werneth School website
 DCSF performance tables: Werneth School

Secondary schools in the Metropolitan Borough of Stockport
Academies in the Metropolitan Borough of Stockport